Last Rights may refer to:
Last Rights (album), a 1992 album by Canadian industrial band Skinny Puppy
Last Rights (TV series), a 2005 British television serial

See also
Last Rites (disambiguation)